50 ans is a 1989 Canadian short film directed by Gilles Carle. It won the Short Film Palme d'Or at the 1989 Cannes Film Festival.

Summary
The film consists of brief clips, celebrating the 50th anniversary of the National Film Board of Canada. The following films are included in the short:

Very Nice, Very Nice (1961)
Neighbours (1952) 
Evolution (1971)
Pas de Deux (1968)
Bead Game (1977)
The Railrodder (1965)

References

External links

NFB Web page for 50 ans (in French)

1989 films
1989 documentary films
1989 short films
Canadian short documentary films
1980s French-language films
Canadian black-and-white films
Films directed by Gilles Carle
Short Film Palme d'Or winners
National Film Board of Canada short films
Documentary films about the cinema of Canada
National Film Board of Canada documentaries
Collage film
1980s short documentary films
French-language Canadian films
1980s Canadian films